Seven pillars may refer to:

Seven Pillars for Prosperity, policy statement of the Progressive Canadian Party
Seven Pillars Institute for Global Finance and Ethics (SPI) in Lawrence, Kansas
Seven pillars of Ismailism in Shia Islam and in Nizari Ismailism
Seven pillars of scholarly wisdom by the Jesus Seminar
Seven Pillars of Wisdom, the autobiographical account of T. E. Lawrence ("Lawrence of Arabia")
The Seven Pillars of Life described by Daniel E. Koshland
The Seven Pillars of Servant Leadership, a book by James Sipe and Don Frick
Seven Pillars, a Miami Indian historic trading ground near Peoria, Miami County, Indiana
SCONUL's seven pillars of information literacy in Learning development by the Society of College, National and University Libraries

See also 
III: Tabula Rasa or Death and the Seven Pillars, an album by Dutch rock group The Devil's Blood
Five pillars (disambiguation)
Sixth Pillar of Islam
Twelve Pillars to Peace and Prosperity Party